The albums discography of American country music artist Tammy Wynette contains 33 studio albums, 55 compilation albums, 2 box sets and has appeared on 6 additional albums. In 1966, Wynette signed a recording contract with Epic Records. The following year, her debut studio album entitled Your Good Girl's Gonna Go Bad was issued, peaking at number 7 on the Billboard Country Albums chart. The same year, she collaborated with David Houston on the studio album My Elusive Dreams, which reached number 11 on the same chart. The following year, her fourth studio album D-I-V-O-R-C-E peaked at number 1 on the Country Albums list, spending two weeks at the top spot. Wynette's fifth studio record Stand by Your Man (1969) reached number 2 on the country albums chart and peaked at number 43 on the Billboard 200 albums list. Wynette's first compilation released entitled Tammy's Greatest Hits (1969) would spend 61 weeks on the Billboard 200 before peaking at number 37.

Into the 1970s, Wynette released several studio albums per year. Reaching the top ten on the Top Country Albums chart during this time included Tammy's Touch (1970), The Ways to Love a Man (1970) and My Man (1972). After several more studio releases, her 1976 albums, 'Til I Can Make It on My Own and You and Me, reached the top five of the Country Albums chart. Wynette issued four more studio albums before the end of decade, including One of a Kind (1977) and Just Tammy (1979).

By the 1980s, Wynette's commercial success began to decline. Her highest-charting studio releases peaked within top forty positions on the Country Albums chart: Only Lonely Sometimes (1980), Soft Touch (1982) and Sometimes When We Touch (1985). Her 1987 studio album Higher Ground was critically acclaimed and featured collaborations with various music artists. In 1993, Wynette collaborated with Loretta Lynn and Dolly Parton on the studio release Honky Tonk Angels. The album was certified gold in sales by the Recording Industry Association of America for exceeding 500,000 units. Her final studio album was 1994's Without Walls, which featured collaborations with Sting and Elton John.

Studio albums

1960s

1970s

1980s

1990s

Compilation albums

1960s

1970s

1980s

1990s

2000s–2010s

Box sets

Other album appearances

References

External links
 Tammy Wynette at Discogs

Discographies of American artists
Country music discographies